Lille Langebro, is located close to and named after the Langebro bridge, is a walking and cycling bridge in Copenhagen, Denmark. It was designed by WilkinsonEyre and it is classified as a double-swing bridge. The unique visual elements include the twisted and curved design.

Design 

There was a competition for the commission to build the Lille Langebro bridge and it was awarded to WilkinsonEyre in 2015. WilkinsonEyre's design includes lighting which is hidden in the handrail: the effect is to make the bridge look like a twisted ribbon when it is lit up after dark.

The bridge was designed for bicycles and pedestrians. The bridge is classified as a double-swing bridge based on its sectional design and ability to swing open. It crosses the inner harbour north of Langebro and features an elegant curvature. The bridge is constructed with steel.

Engineering 

The bridge has the ability to swing open so that boats may pass. There are two rotating sections which open together. The sections swing open using gravity to move the bridge sections.

According to the engineers at Buro Happold one of the challenges was to get the two horizontally rotating bridge components to come together and lock. Most bridges lock together with pins; but for this bridge the engineers utilized mechanical and hydraulic components that lock the bridge together when closed.

The handrail is made of brushed stainless steel and there is a see-through mesh covering the supports. The bridge is divided into a  lane for pedestrians and a  lane for cycles.

Awards 

RIBA International Awards for Excellence 2021

Gallery

References

External links 
Video of the engineering of the bridge 

Bridges in Copenhagen
Cyclist bridges in Denmark
Bridges in Denmark
Beam bridges in Denmark
2019 introductions
Buildings and structures in Copenhagen
Pedestrian bridges in Denmark
Bridges completed in 2019
Swing bridges in Denmark